Platygyra is a genus of stony corals in the family Merulinidae.

Species 
The following species are currently recognized:
Platygyra acuta Veron, 2002
Platygyra carnosus Veron, 2002
Platygyra contorta Veron, 1990
Platygyra crosslandi (Matthai, 1928)
Platygyra daedalea (Ellis & Solander, 1786)
Platygyra lamellina (Ehrenberg, 1834)
Platygyra pini Chevalier, 1975
Platygyra ryukyuensis Yabe & Sugiyama, 1935
Platygyra sinensis (Milne Edwards & Haime, 1849)
Platygyra verweyi Wijsman-Best, 1976
Platygyra yaeyamaensis (Eguchi & Shirai, 1977)

References

External links 

Merulinidae
Scleractinia genera
Taxa named by Christian Gottfried Ehrenberg